Taranis adenensis is a species of sea snail, a marine gastropod mollusk in the family Raphitomidae.

Description

Distribution
This marine species occurs off the Gulf of Aden.

References

External links
 Morassi, M.; Bonfitto, A. (2013). Three new bathyal raphitomine gastropods (Mollusca: Conoidea) from the Indo-Pacific region. Zootaxa. 3620(4)

adenensis
Gastropods described in 2013